From 2004–2012, electoral laws in Alberta, Canada fixed the number of legislature seats at 83.  Prior to the 26th general election, the Alberta Electoral Boundaries Commission was given the task of re-distributing the province's electoral divisions.  In February 2003, the Commission recommended 83 divisions as follows:

As a result of the re-distribution, Calgary gained two seats.  Edmonton lost one seat, and one special consideration division was eliminated.  Dunvegan is the sole remaining "special" division - due to its isolation it is allowed to have a population below 75% of the provincial average.  Lesser Slave Lake is now considered to be a standard rural division as its boundaries were re-drawn so that its population is slightly above 75% of the provincial average.  One urbanized division outside Calgary and Edmonton was added, and two rural seats were eliminated.

See also
Alberta Electoral Boundary Re-distribution, 2010

2004 in Alberta
Electoral Boundary Re-distribution 2004
Electoral redistributions in Canada
Alberta Legislature
2004 in Canadian politics